Pemona is a monotypic genus of South American cellar spiders containing the single species, Pemona sapo. It was first described by B. A. Huber and L. S. Carvalho in 2019, and it has only been found in Venezuela.

See also
 List of Pholcidae species

References

Monotypic Pholcidae genera
Invertebrates of Venezuela